The 2005–06 Seton Hall Pirates men's basketball team represented Seton Hall University as a member of the Big East Conference during the 2005–06 NCAA men's college basketball season. The team was led by head coach Louis Orr and played their home games at Continental Airlines Arena in East Rutherford, New Jersey.

Roster

Schedule and results

|-
!colspan=9 style=| Regular Season

|-
!colspan=9 style=| Big East Tournament

|-
!colspan=9 style=| NCAA Tournament

References

Seton Hall Pirates men's basketball seasons
Seton Hall
Seton Hall
Seton Hall
Seton Hall